Second Thoughts is the second studio album by New Zealand art rock band Split Enz. It was recorded in London with Roxy Music's guitarist Phil Manzanera producing the album.

Four of the songs on the album were reworked versions of songs from their 1975 debut album, Mental Notes. Two other songs on the album had been first recorded during the Mental Notes sessions, but left off and re-recorded for Second Thoughts. There were two new songs, both written by Phil Judd, and a re-recording of an early Judd/Finn composition ("129"), which for the Second Thoughts version, was renamed "Matinee Idyll".

The album was called Mental Notes when released outside Australasia and also featured a reworked version of the Mental Notes cover (for comparison see original and remake). Wally Wilkinson's image was replaced with that of Robert Gillies, and some band members are shown with newer haircuts: Phil Judd was now bald, and Tim Finn had his sides shaved.

Tim Finn, Robert Gillies and Eddie Rayner have said that the band felt the songs needed to be redone. But both Phil Judd and Noel Crombie have said that the re-recording of the Mental Notes tracks was a waste of time. On his MySpace forum, Phil has said that Tim Finn was obsessed with making the songs sound better, while he had new songs that he wanted to record.

Track listing

* New arrangement of a song that first appeared on Mental Notes
† Recorded during the Mental Notes sessions but not included in it, and re-recorded for Second Thoughts

Personnel 
Split Enz
 Tim Finn – vocals, piano on "Stranger Than Fiction"
 Phil Judd – vocals, guitars, mandolin
 Jonathan Michael Chunn – bass, piano on "Titus"
 Noel Crombie – percussion
 Emlyn Crowther – drums
 Robert Gillies – saxophone, trumpet
 Edward Rayner – keyboards
Additional personnel
 Miles Golding – violin on "Stranger Than Fiction" and "Matinee Idyll"
 Ian Sharp – cello on "Matinee Idyll"
 Rhett Davies, Guy Bidmead –  Recording engineers
 Phil Manzanera – producer
 Rhett Davies – Mixing engineer
 John Prew – Front cover photograph
 Split Enz – Back snaps
 Special Thanks To Dave Russell and Wally Wilkinson

Charts

References

Split Enz albums
1976 albums
Chrysalis Records albums
Albums produced by Phil Manzanera
Mushroom Records albums